Galatasaray Swimming Team is the men's and women's swimming section of Galatasaray S.K., a major sports club in Istanbul, Turkey.

Technical and managerial staff

Current squad

Galatasaray swimming team

International success

International Prince Islands Cup:
Winners (3): 1997, 1999, 2001
Luxembourg Swimming Championship:
Winners(4): 1998, 1999, 2000, 2002
Internationales Stuttgarter Schwimfest:
Winners(1): 2004
Sun Cup:
Winners (1): 1989
International Chios Swimming Cup:
Winners (1): 1989

Galatasaray Men's Swimming Team 
Turkish Summer Swimming Championship - Senior's 
 Winner (18): 1980, 1983, 1988, 1991, 1992, 1993, 1994, 1995, 1996, 1997, 1999, 2001, 2002, 2006, 2010, 2011, 2012, 2013

Turkish Winter Swimming Championship - Senior's 
 Winner (10): 1991, 1992, 1993, 1994, 1995, 1996, 1997, 2002, 2003, 2010

Galatasaray Women's Swimming Team 
Turkish Summer Swimming Championship - Senior's 
 Winner (18): 1980, 1981, 1982, 1983, 1985, 1986, 1987, 1988, 1989, 1991, 1992, 1993, 1994, 1995, 1996, 1997, 2001, 2002

Turkish Winter Swimming Championship - Senior's 
 Winner (10): 1991, 1992, 1993, 1994, 1995, 1997, 2001, 2002, 2003, 2010

References

External links
Galatasaray SK Official Web Site 
Galatasaray Swimming Official Site  

Galatasaray Swimming
Swimming in Turkey
Swim teams
Sport in Istanbul
1873 establishments in the Ottoman Empire